is a Japanese professional football team based in Numazu, Shizuoka Prefecture. They currently play in J3 League, the Japanese third tier of professional football.

History 
Azul Claro Numazu was established in 1977 as Numazu Arsenal and slowly progressed through the tiers of Shizuoka prefectural leagues. In 2006 the club began the process of transformation into a professional organization with the ultimate goal of joining the J.League. The same year the club adopted its current name, Azul Claro (Meaning "light blue" in Portuguese and Spanish).

In 2012 Azul Claro won promotion to Tōkai Adult Soccer League and quickly progressed through its ranks, spending only a season in each of its divisions. Though they have finished only fourth in 2013 Tōkai League, they were considered as serious contenders for admission to the newly created J3 League. On September 17, 2013, the club has been granted the J. League Associate Membership and passed all stages of licensing and inspection by the league. However, they were only the 3rd choice club for the only Regional League spot in J3 so eventually, they had to give way to Grulla Morioka. The club has won the promotion anyway though—they were selected by the Japan Football League board as one of the teams to play in the 2014 season.

After a 3rd-place finish in the 2016 season, they've been welcomed to play professional football from 2017 and onward, as they'll be the 14th original club in the J3 League.

League & cup record 

Key

Current squad 
As of 9 March 2023.

Club officials 
For the 2023 season.

Managerial history

Kit evolution

Colour, sponsors and manufacturers

References

External links 
 Official Site 

 
Football clubs in Japan
J.League clubs
Sports teams in Shizuoka Prefecture
Japan Football League clubs
Association football clubs established in 1977
1977 establishments in Japan
Numazu, Shizuoka